The Unification Act (or) was an agreement signed on 22 January 1919, by the Ukrainian People's Republic and the West Ukrainian People's Republic on the St Sophia Square in Kyiv. Since 1999 the Day of Unity of Ukraine, celebrated every year on 22 January to mark the signing of the treaty, is a state holiday; but not a public holiday.

History

On 9 January (22), 1918, the Central Council of Ukraine, with its Fourth Universal, proclaimed the Ukrainian People's Republic an independent, sovereign state of the Ukrainian people.

On 1 December 1918, a pre-accession agreement on the further unification of the two republics into a single state was concluded between the Ukrainian People's Republic and the Western Ukrainian People's Republic in Fastiv. On 3 January 1919, the Ukrainian National Council of the Western Ukrainian People's Republic in Stanislaviv ratified it and sent a delegation to negotiate with the UPR government, and on 22 January 1919, the UPR Directory issued a universal declaring the creation of a single and independent UPR. On the same day, in a solemn atmosphere, it was announced on Sofia Square in Kyiv.

Eyewitnesses testified about the course of events in Kyiv, to which Levko Lukasevych refers in his book On the Slope of Age.

It is a frosty day, the trees are covered with frost. From the morning the city has a festive look. National flags and banners everywhere. Carpets and canvases with bright Ukrainian drawings are hung on the balconies of the houses. Sofia Square and neighboring streets are especially beautifully decorated. Among them are the house where the central telegraph office is located and the house of the Kyiv Provincial Zemstvo. Here on the balconies are portraits and busts of Taras Shevchenko, decorated with national ribbons, as well as flags. On the Triumphal Arch at the entrance from Volodymyrska Street to Sophia Square are the ancient coats of arms of Eastern Ukraine and Halychyna. Coats of arms of almost all Ukrainian provinces and posters are placed on the pillars all over the square.

At eleven o'clock in the morning, Ukrainian infantry units, artillery, and crossbow crews began to march to the sounds of music, which became wallpaper on all four sides of the square. People followed the army, a large number of people gathered, filled the entire square and neighboring streets. Many of those present climbed the trees to see the action from there.

The placement of delegations in places and the whole ceremony of the holiday was headed by the artist Mykola Sadovsky. Soon before the troops were new ranks of students, who came accompanied by teachers with national flags and posters. Of the numerous delegations that arrived at the ceremony, the first to appear were railway employees with a large banner that read: Glory to Ukrainian Heroes! Afterwards, delegations from ministries and other institutions arrived, and there were processions from all Kyiv churches.

The clergy gathered in St. Sophia Cathedral for the Divine Liturgy. It was ruled by the Bishop of Cherkasy Nazariy. The square is getting tighter. Members of the Halychynian delegation, government officials with the chairman of the Council of Ministers Volodymyr Chekhivskyi, delegates of the Labor Congress, representatives of the National Union, the highest civil and military dignitaries, foreign diplomats take their places.

At twelve, to the solemn sounds of bells from the Mazepa bell tower and other churches, and the sound of guns from Pechersk, St. Sophia Cathedral enters the square and stands around the lectern of the clergy with banners built there. In the church procession, Archbishop Agapit of Ekaterinoslav and bishops: George of Minsk, Ambrose of Vinnitsa, Nazarius of Cherkasy, Vasily of Kanev, Dmitry Uman.

In the silence that flared up for a minute, calls "Glory!" were heard from afar! in honor of the members of the Directory who drove up in cars. A military band plays the National Anthem. The most solemn moment of the holiday is coming. The act of unification began with a greeting from the representative of the Ukrainian National Council, the chairman of the Halychynian delegation Lev Bachinsky, and Longin Tsegelsky read out the statement of the Presidium of the Ukrainian National Council and the State Secretariat on the freedom of the ZUNR to unite into one Ukrainian conciliar state. This statement was received by all participants with long-term applause.

The Chairman of the Directory Vladimir Vinnichenko spoke, and Professor Fyodor Shvets delivered the text of the Universal of Sobornost. After that, Archbishop Agapit performed a prayer service with the clergy in the intentions of the Ukrainian people and the Ukrainian state. A military parade of the Halychynian legion of the Sich Riflemen, commanded by Colonel Yevhen Konovalets, took place.

The next day, the Labor Congress began its work. The first item on the agenda was the adoption of the Act of Unity, and as a sign of complete consent, deputies rose from their seats, applauding.

The agreement was aimed at creating a unified Ukrainian state, a movement long-awaited by the intelligentsia on both sides. However, the Act Zluky was regarded as purely symbolic in that both governments still retained their own separate armies, administrations and government structure.

The text of the universal made by the Directorate of the Ukrainian People's Republic:

The territory of Ukraine, divided over the centuries, including Galicia, Bukovina, Carpathian Ruthenia, and Dnieper Ukraine will now become a great united Ukraine. Dreams, for which the best sons of Ukraine fought and died for, have come true.

According to the treaty Halychyna would become an autonomous part of Ukraine.

The Act of Unification was in fact denounced after representatives of the Halychynian Army unilaterally signed the Zyatkiv Agreement with the Volunteer Army on 6 November 1919, without taking into account the opinion of the UPR government, on the cessation of hostilities Halychynian army at the disposal of General Denikin. These agreements were re-approved in Odesa on 17 November 1919, with the leadership of the Novorossiysk region of the ZSPR, and the treaty was ratified in Vinnytsia on 19 November, after which it was implemented.

On 2 December 1919, representatives of the Ukrainian People's Republic and Poland signed a draft declaration in Warsaw, according to which the Ukrainian People's Republic gave Poland Chełm Land, Polissia, Podlachia, Western Volhynia, and Eastern Halychyna. On 4 December 1919, the official diplomatic delegation of the Western Ukrainian People's Republic (S. Vytvytskyi, A. Horbachevskyi, M. Novakivskyi) announced to the UPR Embassy in Warsaw and the Government of the Republic of Poland that the Western Ukrainian People's Republic UPR with the Polish government. On 20 December 1919, the authorized dictator Yevhen Petrushevych convened a meeting of the ZUNR government in Vienna, at which a decision was made to unilaterally repeal the Act of Unification.

However Ukraine was unable to gain independence and in December 1920 the Ukrainian SSR of the Soviet Union was established comprising most of the territory of the Ukrainian People's Republic. The territories of the West Ukrainian People's Republic became mostly part of Poland. In 1939 the territories of both became part of the Ukrainian SSR.

The unification action of 1919 left a deep mark in the historical memory of the Ukrainian people. This was evidenced by the January events of 1939 in Carpatho-Ukraine.

71st anniversary
To mark the 71st anniversary of the signing of the Act Zluky in 1990, over 300,000 Ukrainians created a human chain (approx.  long) from the capital Kyiv to the western Ukrainian city of Lviv on 21 January 1990. The chain, the largest public demonstration in Ukraine since the beginning of Glasnost, was funded by the People's Movement of Ukraine (Rukh) and was partly inspired by the Baltic Way which had taken place the previous year. Also, for the first time since the period of the Ukrainian People's Republic, the blue and yellow national flag was raised.

Participants

On the part of the Ukrainian People's Republic 
Symon Petliura, Volodymyr Vynnychenko, Fedir Shvets, .

On the part of the West Ukrainian People's Republic 
Vasyl Stefanyk (leader), Lonhyn Tsehelskyi, Dmytro Levytskyi, .

Universal text 

ON BEHALF OF THE UKRAINIAN PEOPLE'S REPUBLIC.

THE DIRECTORATE NOTIFIES THE UKRAINIAN PEOPLE ABOUT THE GREAT EVENT IN THE HISTORY OF OUR UKRAINIAN LAND.

ON 3 JANUARY 1919, IN STANISLAVIV CITY, THE UKRAINIAN NATIONAL COUNCIL OF THE WEST UKRAINIAN PEOPLE'S REPUBLIC, EXPRESSING THE WILL OF ALL UKRAINIANS OF THE FORMER AUSTRIAN EMPIRE AND ACTING AS THEIR HIGHEST LEGISLATOR, SOLEMNLY PROCLAIMED THE UNIFICATION OF THE WESTERN UKRAINIAN PEOPLE'S REPUBLIC WITH THE DNIEPER UKRAINIAN PEOPLE'S REPUBLIC IN A SINGLE SOVEREIGN PEOPLE'S REPUBLIC.

GREETING THIS HISTORIC STEP OF OUR WESTERN BROTHERS WITH GREAT JOY, THE DIRECTORATE OF THE UKRAINIAN PEOPLE'S REPUBLIC DECIDED TO ACCEPT THAT UNIFICATION AND TO IMPLEMENT IT ON THE TERMS SPECIFIED IN THE RESOLUTION OF THE WESTERN UKRAINIAN PEOPLE'S REPUBLIC OF 3 JANUARY 1919.

FROM NOW ON, THE PARTS OF THE SINGLE UKRAINE, WHICH WERE SEPARATED FOR CENTURIES — THE WEST UKRAINIAN NATIONAL REPUBLIC / HALYCHYNA, BUKOVYNA AND HUNGARIAN UKRAINE / AND THE GREAT DNIEPER UKRAINE — BECOME ONE.

THE CENTURIES-LONG DREAMS THAT THE BEST SONS OF UKRAINE LIVED WITH AND DIED FOR CAME TRUE.

FROM NOW ON THERE IS UNIFIED AND INDEPENDENT UKRAINIAN PEOPLE'S REPUBLIC

Day of Unity of Ukraine
On 21 January 1999, the President of Ukraine Leonid Kuchma decreed the "Day of Reunion of Ukraine", a government holiday, celebrated every year on 22 January to mark the political and historical significance of the 1919 agreement. It is not a public holiday. In December 2011, President Viktor Yanukovych caused public controversy when he merged the "Day of Freedom" into this day, naming it officially the "Day of Unity and Freedom of Ukraine". The "Day of Freedom" was created in 2005 by President Viktor Yushchenko, Yanukovych's opponent, to be celebrated on 22 November in commemoration of the Orange Revolution. President Yanukovych stated he changed the day of celebration because of "numerous appeals from the public". Mid-October 2014 President Petro Poroshenko undid Yanukovych's merging when he decreed that 21 November will be celebrated as "Day of Dignity and Freedom" in honour of the Euromaidan-protests that started on 21 November 2013.

See also
 Constitution of the Ukrainian People's Republic
 Universals
 First Universal of the Ukrainian Central Council
 Second Universal of the Ukrainian Central Council
 Third Universal of the Ukrainian Central Council
 Fourth Universal of the Ukrainian Central Council

References

External links

 
 

Political history of Ukraine
Treaties concluded in 1919
1919 documents
1919 in Ukraine
National revivals
National unifications
Ukrainian independence movement
Ukraine
Legal history of Ukraine
1910s in Kyiv
January observances
Treaties of the Ukrainian People's Republic